Orhoakpor is a town close to Warri and Ughelli in Ethiope-East Local Government Council, in Delta State, Nigeria.

References

Populated places in Delta State